Jaime Ramírez Bernal (born 20 January 1989 in Bogotá, Colombia) is a Colombian track and road cyclist.

Career 
Jaime Ramírez won the bronze medal in the Madison at the 2007 UCI Junior Track World Championships in Aguascalientes, Mexico, together with Edwin Ávila, behind the Russian and Australian teams. In 2008, he rode for the Italian-Serbian UCI Continental team . In 2013, he won the Tobago Cycling Classic.

Major results
2007
 3rd  Madison, UCI Junior Track World Championships (with Edwin Ávila)
2011
 7th Tobago Cycling Classic
2013
 1st Tobago Cycling Classic
 7th Overall Vuelta a Costa Rica
2015
 6th Tobago Cycling Classic
2016
 2nd Tobago Cycling Classic

External links 

 Jaime Ramírez at FirstCycling.com

References 

Colombian male cyclists
Living people
1989 births
Colombian track cyclists
Sportspeople from Bogotá
20th-century Colombian people
21st-century Colombian people